Reeves Peninsula is a snow-covered peninsula along the north side of Edward VII Peninsula. It extends between the lower ends of the Dalton Glacier and Gerry Glacier into southern Sulzberger Bay. This area was explored from the air and rudely mapped by the Byrd Antarctic Expedition, 1928–30. The peninsula was mapped by United States Geological Survey (USGS) from surveys and U.S. Navy air photos, 1959–65. Named by Advisory Committee on Antarctic Names (US-ACAN), at the suggestion of Admiral R.E. Byrd, for John M. Reeves (of Reeves Brothers, Inc.) who assisted the Byrd Antarctic Expedition of 1928-30 and 1933–35 with contributions of sheepskin-lined coats, and by the development and donation of windproof material for cold weather clothing.
 

Peninsulas of Antarctica
King Edward VII Land